Charles Ferguson Paul (April 26, 1902 – February 17, 1965) was a United States district judge of the United States District Court for the Northern District of West Virginia.

Education and career

Born in Wheeling, West Virginia, Paul received an Artium Baccalaureus degree from West Virginia University in 1923 and a Bachelor of Laws from Harvard Law School in 1926. He was in private practice in Wheeling from 1926 to 1960.

Federal judicial service

On January 11, 1960, Paul was nominated by President Dwight D. Eisenhower to a seat on the United States District Court for the Northern District of West Virginia vacated by Judge Herbert Stephenson Boreman. Paul was confirmed by the United States Senate on March 1, 1960, and received his commission on March 5, 1960. He served as Chief Judge from 1963 until his death on February 17, 1965.

References

Sources
 

1902 births
1965 deaths
Judges of the United States District Court for the Northern District of West Virginia
United States district court judges appointed by Dwight D. Eisenhower
20th-century American judges
Lawyers from Wheeling, West Virginia
West Virginia University alumni
Harvard Law School alumni
20th-century American lawyers